Elections were held in Illinois on Tuesday, November 8, 1988.

Primaries were held on March 15.

Election information

Turnout
Turnout during the primary was 42.56%, with 2,552,932 ballots cast (with 1,588,438 Democratic ballots, 899,153 Republican ballots, 418 Illinois Solidarity, and 34,923 nonpartisan ballots cast).

Turnout during the general election was 73.89%, 4,697,192 ballots cast.

Straight-ticket voting
Illinois had a straight-ticket voting option in 1988.

Federal elections

United States President

Illinois voted for Republican ticket of George H. W. Bush and Dan Quayle.

This was the sixth consecutive election in which the state had voted for the Republican ticket in a presidential election. As of the 2020 election, it is also the last time that the state has voted for the Republican ticket.

United States House

All of Illinois' 22 congressional seats were up for reelection in 1988.

State elections

State Senate
Some of the seats of the Illinois Senate were up for election in 1988. Democrats retained control of the chamber.

State House of Representatives
All of the seats in the Illinois House of Representatives were up for election in 1988. Democrats retained control of the chamber.

Trustees of University of Illinois

A regularly-scheduled election was held for three of nine seats for Trustees of University of Illinois system for full six-year terms, while a special election was held to fill an additional seat for a partial term.

Regular election
An election was held for three of nine seats for Trustees of University of Illinois system for six-year terms.

The election saw the election of new three new trustees, Republicans Donald W. Grabowski and Judith Reese as well as Democrat Ken Boyle.

First-term incumbent Democrat Albert N. Logan lost reelection.

Third-term incumbent Democrats George W. Howard III and William D. Forsyth Jr. were not nominated for reelection.

Special election
A special election was held to fill the trustee seat left vacant by Democrat Anne E. Smith. Smith's unexpired term would end in 1991. The seat was filled by the interim appointment of Republican Paul R. Cicero. He was defeated by Democrat Gloria Jackson Bacon. 

Turnout in the special election was 60.60%.

Judicial elections
Multiple judicial positions were up for election in 1988.

Ballot measures
Illinois voters voted on several ballot measures in 1988. In order to be approved, measures required either 60% support among those specifically voting on the measure or 50% support among all ballots cast in the elections.

Redemption Period for Tax Delinquent Property Amendment
The Illinois Redemption Period for Tax Delinquent Property Amendment, a legislatively referred constitutional amendment which would amend Article IX, Section 8 of the Constitution of Illinois to  modify the redemption period on the sale of a tax delinquent property, failed to meet either threshold to amend the constitution. It only missed the threshold of 60% of votes cast specifically on the measure by a mere 0.87% margin (21,960 votes).

Voting Requirement Amendment 
Voters approved the Voting Requirement Amendment, a legislatively referred constitutional amendment which amended Article III, Section 1 of the Constitution of Illinois to lower the voting age in the state constitution to 18 and lower the residency requirement to vote to 30 days.

The voting age in Illinois was already  18, due to the passage of the Twenty-sixth Amendment to the United States Constitution. However, the voting age in the state constitution (superseded by United States Constitution) was still 21.

Proposed call for a Constitutional Convention
A measure which would call for a state constitutional convention failed. Article XIV of the Constitution of Illinois requires that Illinois voters be asked at least every 20 years if they desire a constitutional convention, thus this election was an automatic ballot referral. It was constitutionally required to be held, since the last vote on holding a constitutional convention had occurred in 1968.

Local elections
Local elections were held. These included county elections, such as the Cook County elections.

References

 
Illinois